Javelina Stadium is a stadium in Kingsville, Texas.  It is primarily used for American football, and is the home field of Texas A&M University–Kingsville.  The stadium holds 15,000 people and opened in 1950.

A new scoreboard was installed during the 2006 football season. The scoreboard is the largest scoreboard in NCAA Division II. It features a three camera system and a fully functional production room located under the east side grandstand. It also features a new sound system.

As the home of the Javelinas, the stadium has seen Texas A&M-Kingsville win 7 National Championships in 1959, 1969, 1970, 1974, 1975, 1976, and 1979.  Also of note, the Javelinas achieved a 42-game winning streak - undefeated and untied from their last game of 1973 through the third game of 1977.

In addition to college football, the stadium serves as the home of Henrietta M. King High School's football team and is often selected as a neutral site for high school football playoff games.

From 2001 to 2011, it hosted the Cactus Bowl, an all-star game for NCAA Division II seniors.

Gallery

References

College football venues
Texas A&M–Kingsville Javelinas football
American football venues in Texas
1950 establishments in Texas
Sports venues completed in 1950
High school football venues in Texas